In April 1978, the South African Minister of Defence authorized the formation of 44 Signal Squadron. From 24 September 1980 until October 1986, 44 Signal Squadron supported 44 Brigade in all aspects of signals, e.g., the supply of communication and the manning of a Communication Centrum (Comcen). From 2 October 1986, the Squadron was upgraded to a Signal Unit with Commandant Lombard as commander and tasked to supply the Brigade with communication and establish a full-strength Unit. The unit's second in command was Maj P. Drotsky and the RSM P. Snyders. The signal unit flag was authorized in 1986. After the restructuring of the SADF as the SANDF in 1994, the unit was renamed 13 Signals Squadron.

References

Further reading
 

Army units and formations of South Africa
Airborne units and formations of South Africa
Military units and formations in Bloemfontein
Military units and formations established in 1978
Military units and formations of South Africa in the Border War